Achupallas Parish is a rural parish in Ecuador, Chimborazo Province, Alausí Canton. Its seat is Achupallas.

Communities 
Azuay, Shaglay, Mapaguiña, San Antonio, Bactinag, San Francisco, Shumyd, Letrapungo, Collaloma, Pucará, Totoras, Guangra, Jubal and Pomacocha.

References 
 www.inec.gov.ec
 Achupalla Parish (Spanish)

External links 
 Map of the Chimborazo Province

Parishes of Ecuador
Geography of Chimborazo Province